Homoeosoma candefactella is a species of snout moth in the genus Homoeosoma. It was described by Ragonot in 1887, and is known from Cyprus and Turkey.

References

Moths described in 1887
Phycitini